Smyadovo (ISO transliterated Smjadovo) is a town in eastern Bulgaria, part of Shumen Province. It is the administrative centre of the homonymous Smyadovo Municipality, which lies in the southeastern part of the province. As of December 2009, the town has a population of 4,036 inhabitants.

The operatic mezzo soprano Alexandrina Miltcheva was born in Smyadovo on 27 November 1934.

Smyadovo lies in the southeastern Danubian Plain, at the northern foot of the eastern Balkan Mountains. It was first mentioned in early Ottoman times (Evliya Çelebi mentions it as Smedovak) and was proclaimed a town in 1969.

Smyadovo Cove in Rugged Island in the South Shetland Islands, Antarctica is named after Smyadovo.

Municipality

Smyadovo municipality covers an area of 354 square kilometres (of which 180 square kilometres arable) and includes the following 10 places:
 Aleksandrovo
 Byal Bryag
 Cherni Vrah
 Kalnovo
 Novo Yankovo
 Rish
 Smyadovo
 Veselinovo
 Yankovo
 Zhelad

References

External links

 Web page about Smyadovo 

Towns in Bulgaria
Populated places in Shumen Province